Philinoidea is a taxonomic superfamily of sea slugs, specifically headshield slugs, marine gastropod mollusks in the order Cephalaspidea.

Anatomy
The species in the Superfamily Philinoidea are generally small animals, and have no shell or gills. Unlike some related forms, the visceral mass is not sharply set off from the rest of the body.

Taxonomy
According to the latest taxonomy, the following families are recognised in the Superfamily Philinoidea:
 Aglajidae 
 Alacuppidae 
 Antarctophilinidae Moles, Avila & Malaquias, 2019
 Colpodaspididae 
 Gastropteridae 
 Laonidae 
 Philinidae 
 Philinoglossidae 
 Philinorbidae 
 Philinorbis Habe, 1950
 Pseudophiline Habe, 1976
 Scaphandridae

References

External links 

Euopisthobranchia
Taxa named by John Edward Gray
Gastropod superfamilies